Anne Berthelot (born 1 November 1957) is a French professor of Medieval French literature and studies. She is currently teaching at the University of Connecticut since 1990.

Career 
Anne Berthelot is an  since 1980, and a graduate of the École normale supérieure. Then she pursued a Doctor of Letters at Paris-Sorbonne University in 1987, with the research work  under the direction of the Romanist and Medievalist .

She is a specialist in the prose romances of the 13th century, she is particularly interested in the problems of enunciation and specialises in Arthurian Literature with a comparative approach, she has written numerous books and articles on these subjects. She helped to edit the Lancelot-Graal and prepared a study of Merlin in the literature of England, France and Germany from the 12th to the 15th centuries.

The historical origins of the Arthurian legend are lost in the mists of time: Roman Britain, Sarmatians, Picts or the Saxon kings? Who were Arthur's contemporaries? Archaeological findings in Wales, Cornwall and Scotland suggest the possible existence of this legendary figure. Arthurian legend is central to Anglo-Saxon culture, and by the 12th century King Arthur and his kingdom had become a national myth, elaborated by English and French writers. It owes its existence in literature to an Anglo-French rivalry: Henry II of England, for establishing his legitimacy, had the story of an Anglo-Saxon hero written that was destined to be a counterpart to Charlemagne. Thus was born the legend of Arthur. During the Middle Ages, Arthur became the absolute model of a knight, herald of courtly values and defender of Christendom.

Between myth and history, Anne Berthelot manages to unravel the threads of this great legend in a small but lavishly illustrated volume— (lit. 'Arthur and the Round Table: The Power of a Legend'; UK edition – King Arthur: Chivalry and Legend; US edition – King Arthur and the Knights of the Round Table)—published by Éditions Gallimard as the 298th volume in their  series for the "Découvertes" collection.

The book contains a huge number of colour illustrations taken from medieval illuminated manuscripts, 16th and 19th-century engravings, Pre-Raphaelite paintings and other sources. It opens with a series of reproductions of Julia Margaret Cameron's photographic illustrations for Idylls of the King—a cycle of twelve narrative poems by Alfred Tennyson—which retells the legend of King Arthur. The body text is divided into five chapters: I, "The Historical Context"; II, "The Creation of a Legend"; III, "The Life of Arthur"; IV, "Feudalism and Chivalry"; V, "An Extraordinary Literary Flowering". The following "Documents" section in British edition—which is reformulated by Thames & Hudson—contains a compilation of excerpts which is divided into six chapters: 1, Arthur in 12th-century literature; 2, Arthur in the Middle Ages; 3, The Round Table and the Holy Grail; 4, Arthur in the 19th and 20th centuries; 5, In the footsteps of King Arthur; 6, King Arthur in the cinema. The original French version has seven chapters in this section and the contents are slightly different. At the end of the book are further reading, list of illustrations and index. It has been translated into American and British English, Japanese, Polish, and South Korean.

Selected bibliography 
 Le Chevalier à la charette, Le Chevalier au lion : résumé analytique, commentaire critique, documents complémentaires, Nathan, 1991 (critical analysis on Chrétien de Troyes' works)
 Arthur et la Table ronde : La force d'une légende, collection « Découvertes Gallimard » (nº 298), série Littératures. Éditions Gallimard, 1996
 UK edition – King Arthur: Chivalry and Legend, 'New Horizons' series. Thames & Hudson, 1997 (reprinted 2004, 2011)
 US edition – King Arthur and the Knights of the Round Table, "Abrams Discoveries" series. Harry N. Abrams, 1997 (reprinted 2009)
 Le roman courtois : Une introduction, Armand Colin, 2005
Collective works and translations
 Translated from Old French by Anne Berthelot and many others, Chrétien de Troyes : Œuvres complètes, collection « Bibliothèque de la Pléiade » (nº 408), Éditions Gallimard, 1994
 Anonymous, edited by AA.VV., Le Livre du Graal, tome I, collection « Bibliothèque de la Pléiade » (nº 476), Éditions Gallimard, 2001
 Anonymous, edited by AA.VV., Le Livre du Graal, tome II, collection « Bibliothèque de la Pléiade » (nº 498), Éditions Gallimard, 2003
 Robert de Boron, translated from Old French by Anne Berthelot, Merlin, collection « La Bibliothèque Gallimard » (nº 164), Éditions Gallimard, 2005

Notes

References

External links 
 King Arthur: Chivalry and Legend at Welsh Wikipedia 

1957 births
French medievalists
Women medievalists
Romance philologists
20th-century French writers
University of Connecticut faculty
École Normale Supérieure alumni
Paris-Sorbonne University alumni
Living people
20th-century French women writers
French women historians